Ten Gallon Shuffle is the first recording released by the New York-based Toshiko Akiyoshi Jazz Orchestra featuring Lew Tabackin (following 13 previous releases by the Los Angeles-based Toshiko Akiyoshi – Lew Tabackin Big Band).  The composition Ten Gallon Shuffle was originally commissioned by Phi Mu Alpha Sinfonia Music Fraternity for the University of Texas Jazz Orchestra.

Track listing
All songs composed and arranged by Toshiko Akiyoshi:
LP side A
 "Ten Gallon Shuffle" – 5:14
 "Fading Beauty" – 7:22
 "Jamming at Carnegie Hall" – 9:51
LP side B
 "Blue Dream" – 15:57
 "Happy Hoofer" – 8:35

Personnel
Toshiko Akiyoshi – piano
Lew Tabackin – tenor saxophone, flute
Walt Weiskopf – tenor saxophone, soprano saxophone, clarinet
Frank Wess – alto saxophone, soprano saxophone, flute
Jim Snidero – alto saxophone, flute, clarinet
Ed Xiques – baritone saxophone, soprano saxophone, bass clarinet
Joe Mosello – trumpet
John Eckert – trumpet
Brian Lynch – trumpet
Chris Albert – trumpet
Hart Smith – trombone
Chris Seiter – trombone
Conrad Herwig – trombone
Phil Teele – bass trombone
Mike Formanek – bass
Scott Robinson – drums

References / External Links
Victor (Japan) Records (Baystate) RVC RJL 8098
Ascent Records ASC 1004
[ Allmusic]

1984 albums
Toshiko Akiyoshi – Lew Tabackin Big Band albums